= Hassan Al-Matrooshi =

Omani poet and translator

- Born: Sultanate of Oman
- Occupations: Poet, translator, and journalist
- Awards: The Tulliola-Renato Filippelli Italian Prize for World Poetry

Hassan Al-Matrooshi (Arabic: حسن المطروشي) is an Omani poet, translator, and journalist. He was born in the Sultanate of Oman. He wrote several poems and poetry collections like The Banished Descendent and he has won several awards, the most important of which is the Tulliola-Renato Filippelli Italian Prize for World Poetry.

== Biography ==
The poet, translator, and journalist Hassan Al-Matrooshi was born in the Sultanate of Oman, where he wrote several poems and poetry collections like his poem The Banished Descendent and Lonely in addition to his poetry collection I Have What To Forget. Several of his works have been translated into different languages such as French and Spanish. The poet participated in poetry reciting events inside and outside Oman to spread culture. In 2019, he won the Italian Tulliola-Renato Filippelli Prize for World Poetry in its twenty fifth session for his poem The Banished Descendent.

== Publications ==
=== Poetry collections ===
- Lonely.. Like My Father's Grave, Al-Nahdha Printing Press, Muscat
- On the Same Mountainside, Arab Diffusion Company, Beirut
- I Have What To Forget, Arab Diffusion Company, Beirut
- The Night is Sufficient For Me, Bait Al-Ghsham Company, Muscat

=== Poems ===
- The Bed
- The Night's Roofs
- A Lonely Man's Contemplations
- I Said Very Little
- Journeys
- A Heart on Two Waters
- House
- A Missing Presence

=== Translations ===
- The Knowledge economy: An Innovative Alternative to a Sustainable Economic Development. "The Sultanate of Oman's Model" by Dr. Ibrahim Alrahbi
- An Omani Man's Diary in Zanzibar by Saud bin Ahmed Alborsaeedy.

=== Studies Produced from his Poetry ===
- Master's thesis about the artistic images in his poetry, published in a book titled “Shadows of the Seagulls: Artistic Imagery in Hassan Al-Matrooshi’s Poems” by the researcher Rashid Alsamry published in The Cultural Club Publications.

== Awards and Prizes ==
- The Royal Commendation Medal, Sultanate of Oman, the poetic figure honored in the 10th Omani Poetry Festival in 2017.
- The Tulliola-Renato Filippelli Italian Prize for World Poetry in 2019.
